James Shepherd Rollo (16 November 1937 – 13 October 2012) was a Scottish footballer who played as a goalkeeper in the Scottish Football League and the Football League.

He was born less than 50 miles from John O'Groats, but moved with his family to Perth. Rollo started his senior career with Hibernian as an understudy to Tommy Younger. He made two league appearances for Hibs, but left the club after a contractual dispute. Rollo was a baker and confectioner by trade and wanted to continue that, but Hibs wanted him to become a full-time professional footballer.

Rollo continued his career in England. He signed for Oldham Athletic, but his time at Boundary Park was hampered by the fierce competition with John Hardie and Johnny Bollands. Rollo was a competent goalkeeper, whose strengths were dealing with high shots and crosses. He spent the 1962–63 season mainly in the Oldham reserve team and only made 10 appearances in the promotion winning side. He then moved to Southport, Bradford City and Scarborough.

After retiring as a football player, Rollo moved to Blairgowrie. An accident involving a fork lift truck meant that he had his right leg amputated in 1989. He fully recovered and worked as a scout for Liverpool, mainly covering Highland Football League matches. Rollo died in October 2012, having suffered from cancer for a lengthy period.

References

External links

1937 births
2012 deaths
Scottish footballers
Association football goalkeepers
Hibernian F.C. players
Poole Town F.C. players
Oldham Athletic A.F.C. players
Southport F.C. players
Bradford City A.F.C. players
Scarborough F.C. players
English Football League players
Scottish Football League players
Sportspeople from Highland (council area)
People from Sutherland
Liverpool F.C. non-playing staff
Jeanfield Swifts F.C. players
People from Helmsdale